African Greeks (also referred to as Afro-Greeks (Afroéllines), refers to citizens or residents of Greece of African descent.

Some families of African descent mainly from Sudan, who were brought to modern-day Greece by the Ottoman Turks as African slaves in the times of the Ottoman Empire, still live in the village of Avato and are Sunni Muslims. Some of them lived before the Population exchange between Greece and Turkey also on the island of Crete.

Such a very small population came to Greece in 1950–1960.

A number of African immigrants arrived in Greece in 1997. However, most came during the 2000s. The majority of the immigrants migrated from Nigeria and Senegal. Some of them also come from Congo, Ghana, Sudan, Tanzania, Zambia, Uganda, Kenya, Mauritius and Angola. Most live in the Patissia and Kypseli area in Athens. Some African immigrants and Greek citizens with ancestry from Africa report being the victim of racist harassment and assaults from suspected far-right Greek Golden Dawn party members.

The South African Embassy in Athens and the Consulate General of South Africa in Thessaloniki, maintains and develops relations between the South Africa and Greece. Embassy of Nigeria in Athens as well and Embassy of Greece in Abuja in Nigeria. Ugandan Consulate in Athens, Embassy of Sudan in Athens, Consulate of Ghana in Athens, Greek Embassy in Democratic republic of Congo, Consulate General of Ethiopia in Athens, Embassy of Angola in Athens, Honorary Consulate of the Republic of Kenya in the Hellenic Republic.

Notable African Greeks

Sport
 Giannis Antetokounmpo - NBA basketball player
 Thanasis Antetokounmpo - NBA basketball player
 Kostas Antetokounmpo - NBA basketball player
 Alex Antetokounmpo - basketball player 
 Daniel Batista Lima – footballer
 Nestoras Kommatos – basketball player
 Sofoklis Schortsanitis – basketball player
 Nery Mantey Niangkouara – swimmer
 Tyler Dorsey – American-Greek NBA basketball player
 Emmanouil Karalis – pole vaulter 
 Konstadinos Douvalidis – hurdler 
 Christopher Duberet – footballer
 Marios Ogkmpoe - footballer
 Etinosa Erevbenagie - basketball player
 Yvette Jarvis - basketball player, model, actress
 Alfa Ntiallo - basketball player
 Kostas Ezomo - basketball player

Entertainment 
 Isaias Matiaba – singer
 Jerome Kaluta – singer, actor
 MC Yinka – singer, actor
 Black Morris aka Negros to Moria – singer
 Samuel Akinola – actor
 Idra Kayne – singer
 Stefan Mwange – actor
 Ksenia Dania – singer, actress
 Deborah Odong – actress
 Niki Sereti – actress
 Marina Satti - singer, actress, musician, song writer
 Gabriella Demetriades - model, actress

See also

African immigration to Europe
Mustafa Olpak

References

External links
Immigration to Greece

African diaspora in Europe
Ethnic groups in Greece
 
Greece